Alanis Morissette is a Canadian rock singer-songwriter and musician from Ottawa, Ontario, Canada. Morissette has released five studio albums internationally through Maverick Records: Jagged Little Pill (1995), Supposed Former Infatuation Junkie (1998), Under Rug Swept (2002), So-Called Chaos (2004), and Flavors of Entanglement (2008). Jagged Little Pill, Supposed Former Infatuation Junkie, and Under Rug Swept debuted at number one on the Billboard 200, and were among the top five on the Canadian Top 50 Album Chart. After leaving Maverick, Morissette released her most recent album, Havoc and Bright Lights (2012) independently via Collective Sounds.

Morissette has won and been nominated for numerous awards; she has won seven Grammy Awards and thirteen Juno Awards. She was nominated for Best New Artist at the 38th Grammy Awards, and won Best New Artist at the 1996 MTV Video Music Awards for her song, "Ironic"; additionally she was nominated for a Tony Award for the stage adaptation of Jagged Little Pill. Morissette has been nominated four times for Songwriter of the Year at the Juno Awards, winning two in 1996 and 1997. Her international debut album, Jagged Little Pill, became the second-best-selling album of the 1990s, with over fifteen million copies sold by 2000 in the United States. In October 2002, Rolling Stone magazine ranked Jagged Little Pill number 31 on its Women in Rock – The 50 Essential Albums list, and in 2003, the album was ranked number 327 on the magazine's "The 500 Greatest Albums of All Time". Jagged Little Pill was also featured in the book 1001 Albums You Must Hear Before You Die. Overall, Morissette has received 26 awards from 56 nominations. She was inducted into Canada's Walk of Fame in 2005.

ASCAP Pop Music Awards

|-
| 1999
| "Uninvited"
| Most Performed Song 
|

American Music Awards

|-
| rowspan=2| 1996
| rowspan=3|Alanis Morissette
|Favorite Pop/Rock Female Artist
|rowspan=2 
|-
|Favorite Pop/Rock New Artist
|-
| rowspan=2|1997
| Favorite Pop/Rock Female Artist
|rowspan=2 
|-
|Jagged Little Pill
|Favorite Pop/Rock Album
|-

Brit Awards

|-
| rowspan=2|1996
| rowspan=3|Alanis Morissette
| International Breakthrough Act
|
|-
| rowspan=2|International Female Solo Artist
|
|-
|1999
|
|-

Billboard

Billboard Music Awards

 
|-
| rowspan=3|1996
| rowspan=2|Herself 
| Top Artist
| rowspan=3 
|- 
| Top Female Artist
|- 
| Jagged Little Pill
| Top Billboard 200 Album

Billboard Women in Music
 
|-
| 2019
| Herself
| Icon Award
|

Canada's Walk of Fame

|-
| 2005
| Herself 
| Walk of Fame
|

Canadian Songwriters Hall of Fame

|-
| 2022
| Herself 
| Hall of Fame 
|

ECHO Awards

|-
| 1996
| rowspan=5|Herself 
| Best International Newcomer
|rowspan=2 
|-
| 1997
| rowspan=4|Best International Female
|-
| 1999
|rowspan=3 
|-
| 2000
|-
| 2003

GAFFA Awards

GAFFA Awards (Denmark)

!
|-
| 1995
| rowspan=3|Herself
| Foreign Newcomer
| 
| style="text-align:center;" rowspan=4|
|-
| 1996
| Foreign Solo Act
| 
|-
| rowspan=2|1998
| Foreign Female Act
|rowspan=2 
|-
| "Thank U"
| Foreign Song
|-
| rowspan=2|2021
| Herself
| Foreign Solo Act
| 
| style="text-align:center;" rowspan=4|
|-
| Such Pretty Forks in the Road
| Foreign Album 
| 
|}

Grammy Awards

!Ref.
|-
| rowspan=6|1996
| Herself
| Best New Artist
|
| rowspan=14|
|-
| rowspan=2|Jagged Little Pill
|Album of the Year
| 
|-
| Best Rock Album
| 
|-
| rowspan=3 |"You Oughta Know"
| Song of the Year
| 
|-
| Best Female Rock Vocal Performance
| 
|-
| Best Rock Song
| 
|-
| rowspan=2|1997
| rowspan=2|"Ironic"
| Record of the Year
| 
|-
| Best Music Video, Short Form
| 
|-
| 1998
| Jagged Little Pill, Live
| Best Long Form Music Video
| 
|-
| rowspan=3|1999
| rowspan=3|"Uninvited"
| Best Rock Song
| 
|-
| Best Female Rock Vocal Performance
| 
|-
| Best Song Written for Visual Media
| 
|-
| 2000
| "Thank U"
| Best Female Pop Vocal Performance
| 
|-
| 2001
| "So Pure"
|Best Female Rock Vocal Performance
|

Groovevolt Music and Fashion Awards

|-
| rowspan=2|2005
| So Called Chaos
| Best Pop Album - Female
| 
|-
| "The Grudge"
| Best Pop Deep Cut
|

Golden Globe Awards

|-
| 1999
|"Uninvited"
| rowspan=2|Best Original Song
|rowspan=2 
|-
|2006
| "Wunderkind"
|-

IFPI Platinum Europe Awards

|-
| 1996
| rowspan=3|Jagged Little Pill
| Award Level 1
|rowspan=6 
|-
| 1997
| Award Level 5
|-
| rowspan=2|1998
| Award Level 6
|-
| Supposed Former Infatuation Junkie
| Award Level 2
|-
| 2000
| MTV Unplugged
| Award Level 1 
|-
| 2002
| Jagged Little Pill
| Award Level 7

Juno Awards

|-
| rowspan=3|1992
|"Too Hot"
| Single of the Year
|rowspan=2 
|-
| "Too Hot (Hott Shot Remix)"
| Best Dance Recording
|-
| Alanis Morissette
| Most Promising Female Vocalist
|rowspan=10 
|-
| rowspan=5|1996
| rowspan=2|Jagged Little Pill
| Album of the Year
|-
|Rock Album of the Year
|-
| rowspan=2|Alanis Morissette
| Female Vocalist of the Year
|-
| Songwriter of the Year
|-
| "You Oughta Know"
| Single of the Year
|-
| rowspan=3|1997
| rowspan=2|Alanis Morissette
| Songwriter of the Year
|-
| International Achievement Award
|-
| "Ironic"
|Single of the Year
|-
| rowspan=5|2000
| rowspan=2|Supposed Former Infatuation Junkie
| Album of the Year
|-
| Pop/Adult Album of the Year
|
|-
| "So Pure"
| Best Video
|
|-
| rowspan=2|Alanis Morissette
|Songwriter of the Year
|rowspan=2 
|-
| Best Female Vocalist
|-
| rowspan=3|2003
| "Hands Clean", "So Unsexy"
| Jack Richardson Producer of the Year Award
|
|-
| Under Rug Swept
| Pop Album of the Year
|rowspan=4 
|-
| Alanis Morissette
| Artist of the Year
|-
| 2004
| Feast on Scraps
| Music DVD of the Year
|-
| rowspan=2|2009
| Alanis Morissette
| Songwriter of the Year
|-
| Flavors of Entanglement
| Pop Album of the Year
|
|-
| rowspan=2|2021
| Alanis Morissette
| Songwriter of the Year
|
|-
|Such Pretty Forks in the Road
|Adult Contemporary Album of the Year
|

Lunas del Auditorio

|-
| 2009
| Herself
| Best Foreign Pop Artist 
|

MTV Europe Music Awards

|-
| 1995
| rowspan=2|Alanis Morissette
| align="center"|Best New Act
|
|-
| rowspan=2|1996
| align="center"|Best Female
|
|-
| "Ironic"
| Best Song
|

MTV Video Music Awards

|-
| rowspan=6|1996
| rowspan=6|"Ironic"
|Video of the Year
|rowspan=3 
|-
| Viewer's Choice Award
|-
| Best Direction in a Video
|-
| Best Editing in a Video
|rowspan=3 
|-
| Best Female Video
|-
| Best New Artist in a Video
|-
|2000
|"So Pure"
| Best Choreography in a Video
|
|-

MTV Video Music Brazil

!Ref.
|-
| 2002
| "Hands Clean"
| Best International Video
| 
|

Music Video Production Awards

|-
|rowspan=2|2005
|rowspan=2|"8 Easy Steps"
| Best Pop Video
| rowspan=2 
|-
| Best Special Effects

NME Awards

! Ref. 
|-
| 1996
| rowspan=2|Herself
| rowspan=2|Best Solo Artist
|rowspan=2 
| rowspan=2|
|-
| 1997

Online Film & Television Association

!Ref.
|-
| 1998
| "Uninvited"
| Best Original Song
| 
|

People's Choice Awards

|-
| rowspan=2|2007
| rowspan=2|"Crazy"
|Favorite Remake
|rowspan=2 
|-
|Favorite Song From a Movie
|-

Polaris Music Prize

!Ref.
|-
| 2016
| rowspan=3|Jagged Little Pill
| rowspan=3|Heritage Award
| 
|
|-
| 2017
| 
|
|-
| 2018
| 
|

Pollstar Concert Industry Awards

|-
| rowspan=2|1996
| Herself
| Best New Rock Artist Tour 
| 
|-
| Jagged Little Tour 
| Club Tour of the Year 
| 
|-
| 1997
| Can't Not Tour
| Major Tour of the Year 
|

Q Awards

 
|-
| 1996
| Herself 
| Best New Act 
|

Rockbjörnen 

|-
| rowspan=2|1996
| Herself 
| Best Foreign Artist 
|rowspan=2  
|-
| Jagged Little Pill 
| Best Foreign Album

Satellite Awards

|-
| 2000
| "Still"
| Best Original Song
|

Teen Choice Awards

|-
| 2002
| Herself 
| Choice Music: Female Artist 
|

Tony Awards

|-
| 2020
| Jagged Little Pill
| Best Musical
|

Viva Comet Awards

|-
| rowspan=2|2002
| rowspan=2|Herself
| Zuschauer-Comet VIVA Plus
| 
|-
| Best International Act 
|

World Music Awards

!Ref.
|-
| rowspan=2|1997
| rowspan=2|Herself
| World's Best Selling Rock Artist
| 
| rowspan=2|
|-
| World's Best Selling Alternative Artist
|

Žebřík Music Awards

!Ref.
|-
| rowspan=6|1996
| rowspan=3|Herself
| Best International Female
| 
| rowspan=6|
|-
| Best International Personality
| 
|-
| Best International Surprise
| 
|-
| Jagged Little Pill
| Best International Album
| 
|-
| rowspan=2|"Ironic"
| Best International Song
| 
|-
| Best International Video
| 
|-
| 1997
| rowspan=2|Herself
| rowspan=2|Best International Female
| 
| rowspan=7|
|-
| rowspan=2|1998
| 
|-
| "Thank U"
| Best International Song
| 
|-
| 1999
| rowspan=8|Herself
| rowspan=6|Best International Female
| 
|-
| 2000
| 
|-
| 2001
| 
|-
| 2002
| 
|-
| 2004
| 
| rowspan=4|
|-
| rowspan=2|2005
| 
|-
| Best International Personality
| 
|-
| 2008
| Best International Female
|

Others
 George and Ira Gershwin Award, UCLA, May 16, 2014 at Pauley Pavilion
 inducted into Canadian Songwriters Hall of Fame, Sept 24, 2022

References

External links
 Official website

Morissette, Alanis
Awards